Anbar Dan (also Romanized as Anbār Dān) is a village in Mehranrud-e Markazi Rural District, in the Central District of Bostanabad County, East Azerbaijan Province, Iran. At the 2006 census, its population was 1,733, in 450 families.

References 

Populated places in Bostanabad County